Chelleh Khaneh-ye Olya (also Romanized as Chelleh Khāneh-ye ‘Olyā and Chelleh Khāneh ‘Olyā; also known as Chelleh Khāneh Bālā, Chelleh Khāneh-ye Bālā, Chelleh Khāneh Yūkhārī, Chilakhāna Yukāri, Chilakhana-Yukhari, and Yūkhārī Chellehkhāneh) is a village in Chelleh Khaneh Rural District, Sufian District, Shabestar County, East Azerbaijan Province, Iran. At the 2006 census, its population was 1,736, in 485 families.

References 

Populated places in Shabestar County